This is a list of the catholicos-patriarchs of the Assyrian Church of the East. The Patriarch is the leader of the Assyrian Church of the East, that represents the traditionalist continuation of the ancient Church of the East.

During the period between the middle of the 16th century and the beginning of the 19th century, that was marked by several internal divisions, traditionalist branch of the Church of the East was represented at first by the senior Eliya line of patriarchs who resided in the Rabban Hormizd Monastery near Alqosh, and later also by the younger Shimun line of patriarch who resided in Qudshanis. Patriarchs of the Shimun line were traditionalists since the 17th century. In 1804, the last patriarch of the Eliya line died without successor, thus enabling the patriarch Shimun XVI (1780–1820) of the Qodshanis line to become the sole primate of the entire traditionalist branch of the Church of the East.

List of traditionalist patriarchs of both lines

1. Eliya line
Based in the Rabban Hormizd Monastery near Alqosh.
 Eliya VI (1558–1591) 
 Eliya VII (1591–1617)
 Eliya VIII (1617–1660) 
 Eliya IX (1660–1700)
 Eliya X (1700–1722)
 Eliya XI (1722–1778)
 Eliya XII (1778–1804)

2. Shimun line
Traditionalist since the 17th century, based in Qudshanis
 Shimun X Eliyah (1600–1638)
 Shimun XI Eshuyow (1638–1656)
 Shimun XII Yoalaha (1656–1662)
 Shimun XIII Dinkha (1662–1700)
 Shimun XIV Shlemon (1700–1740)
 Shimun XV Maqdassi Mikhail (1740–1780)
 Shimun XVI Yohannan (1780–1820)

List of patriarchs since 1804

Residence continued in Qudshanis
 Shimun XVI Yohannan (1780–1820) – since 1804, the only traditionalist Patriarch.
 Shimun XVII Abraham (1820–1861) 
 Shimun XVIII Rubil (1861–1903)
 Shimun XIX Benjamin (1903–1918) – due to the Sayfo, the Residence in Qudshanis ended in 1915, with Patriarch residing starting from 1915 between Urmia and Salmas, Persia until his assassination in 1918 breaking up the multi-national nature of the Church of the East, leaving many non-Assyrian Bishops isolated in different parts of the world to continue their independent Churches of the East autonomously.
 Shimun XX Paulos (1918–1920) – Moved the Patriarchate to Mosul, Iraq.
 Locum Tenens:
 Yosip Khnanisho (coadjutor) (1918–1920)
 Saint Mar Abimalek Timotheus (coadjutor) (1920)
 Shimun XXI Eshai (1920–1975) – forced into exile in 1933 and thus the patriarchate was temporarily located in Cyprus before relocating to Chicago, Illinois in 1940, and finally relocating to San Francisco, California. He ended hereditary patriarchy. He renamed the Church as the Assyrian Church of the East, which along with other reforms led the Ancient Church of the East to secede. He resigned in 1973, although unofficially still remained Patriarch. He was assassinated in San Jose, California, ending the 658-year old Shimun Line.
 Dinkha IV (17 October 1976 – 26 March 2015) – first canonically elected Patriarch since 1600. Consecrated and Enthroned on 17 October 1976 in the Church of St Barnabas, London, United Kingdom. Relocated the Patriarchate to Chicago, Illinois in 1980 after temporarily living in Tehran, Iran. Abolished hereditary succession upon his election.
 Locum Tenens: Aprem Mooken (26 March 2015 – 18 September 2015)
 Gewargis III (18 September 2015 – 6 September 2021) – on 18 September 2015, elected Catholicos-Patriarch by the Holy Synod of the Assyrian Church of the East. Consecrated and Enthroned on 27 September 2015, in the Cathedral Church of St. John the Baptist, Erbil, Iraq. Stepped down from the Patriarchal See on 6 September 2021.
 Awa III (13 September 2021 – present) – on 8 September 2021, elected Catholicos-Patriarch by the Holy Synod of the Assyrian Church of the East. Consecrated and Enthroned on 13 September 2021, on the Feast of the Holy Cross, in the Cathedral Church of St. John the Baptist, Erbil, Iraq.

See also
 Patriarch of the Church of the East
 List of patriarchs of the Church of the East
 Numeration of the Eliya line patriarchs
 Assyrian Church of the East

References

Sources

External links 

Assyrian Church of the East-related lists